David Henry Guthrie (1856 – 31 March 1927) was a New Zealand politician of the Reform Party.

Biography

He was the Minister of Railways (1922–1923) in the Reform Government, and the Member of Parliament for Oroua from 1908 to 1925, when he retired.

He was then appointed to the Legislative Council, from 1925 to 1927 when he died.

References

|-

1856 births
1927 deaths
Reform Party (New Zealand) MPs
Members of the Cabinet of New Zealand
Members of the New Zealand Legislative Council
Reform Party (New Zealand) MLCs
Members of the New Zealand House of Representatives
New Zealand MPs for North Island electorates
Independent MPs of New Zealand